Rodrigo Martínez (born 7 July 1998) is an Argentine rugby union player.  His playing position is prop.

Martínez represented both Ceibos and Olímpia Lions in the Súper Liga Americana de Rugby competition in 2020 and 2021 respectively. He was named in the Argentina squad for the 2021 Rugby Championship. He made his debut in Round 5 of the 2021 Rugby Championship against Australia.

On 1 December 2021, Martinez moved to England as he signed for Wasps in the Premiership Rugby for the rest of the 2021-22 season.

Wasps entered administration on 17 October 2022 and Martínez was made redundant along with all other players and coaching staff.

References

External links
itsrugby.co.uk Profile

1998 births
Living people
Argentine rugby union players
Argentina international rugby union players
Rugby union props
Jaguares (Super Rugby) players
Dogos XV players
Yacare XV players
Wasps RFC players
Pampas XV players